Karyai may refer to:
 Caryae, a town of ancient Arcadia and Laconia
 Caryae (Arcadia), a town of ancient Arcadia
 Karyes, Mount Athos, a town on Mount Athos